Anthrenus munroi is a species of beetle found in Europe, the Near East and North Africa. In Europe, it is known from Bulgaria, Corsica, mainland France, and Ukraine.

External links
Anthrenus munroi at Fauna Europaea

munroi
Beetles described in 1943